ACD/ChemSketch is a molecular modeling program used to create and modify images of chemical structures. Also, there is a software that allows molecules and molecular models displayed in two and three dimensions, to understand the structure of chemical bonds and the nature of the functional groups.

Features 

The program offers some advanced features that allows the molecules rotate and apply color to improve visualization. It has several templates with ions and functional groups with the possibility to add text and use other tools to optimize productions created by the software.

Applications 
Using ACD/ChemSketch is primarily for educational use. With this program it is possible to write and perform chemical equations, diagrams laboratories and chemical structures of various entity.

See also 
 ChemDraw
 Software design
 3D graphics software
 Molecule editor

References

External links 
 Types of Educational Software.
 "Catalogue of Educational Software Libre". CIDETYS, 2011. PDF | OpenLibra ( En español).
 ChemSketch for academic and personal use. Official website: Chemsketch (ACD/Labs)

Chemistry software
Educational software